Abdul Awal is a Awami League politician and the former Member of Parliament of Comilla-20.

Career
Awal was elected to parliament from Comilla-20 as an Awami League candidate in 1973.

References

Awami League politicians
Living people
1st Jatiya Sangsad members
Year of birth missing (living people)